Francisco de León (born 25 July 1961) is a Puerto Rican basketball player. He competed in the men's tournament at the 1988 Summer Olympics.

References

External links
 

1961 births
Living people
People from Guaynabo, Puerto Rico
Puerto Rican men's basketball players
1990 FIBA World Championship players
Olympic basketball players of Puerto Rico
Basketball players at the 1988 Summer Olympics
Place of birth missing (living people)